Anthony Ian Ogus  is an emeritus professor of law at the University of Manchester and the Erasmus University Rotterdam and a pre-eminent scholar in the field of regulation and economic analysis of law. He also writes and lectures on opera, and records English literature for LibriVox.

Publications
Books
Law of Damages (1973)
with E Barendt and N Wikeley, Law of Social Security (1st edn 1978, 5th edn 2002)
Readings in the Economics of Law and Regulation (1984, with Veljanovski)
Regulation: Legal Form and Economic Theory (Clarendon 1994, reprinted 2004)
Controlling the Regulators (1998, with Froud and others)
Regulation, Economics and the Law (2001)
Économie du droit: le cas francais (2002, with Faure)
Costs and Cautionary Tales: Economic Insights for the Law (2006) joint winner of Socio-Legal Studies Association Book Prize 2007
Travels with my Opera Glasses (2013)

Articles
'What Legal Scholars Can Learn From Law and Economics' (2004) 79 Chicago-Kent Law Review 383-402
'The Economic Base of Legal Culture: Networks and Monopolization' (2002) 22 Oxford Journal of Legal Studies 419-434
with N Garoupa, 'A Strategic Interpretation of Legal Transplants' (2006) 36(2) Journal of Legal Studies
'The Paradoxes of Legal Paternalism and How to Resolve Them' (2010) 30 Legal Studies 61-73
'Rethinking Self-Regulation' (1995) 15 OJLS 97-108
'Competition between National Legal Systems: A Contribution of Economic Analysis to Comparative Law' (1999) 48 ICLQ 405-418

See also
Regulation
Environmental law
Law and economics

External links
Manchester University homepage
British academy page
Anthony Ogus homepage
Anthony Ogus reader page at LibriVox

Living people
Academics of the University of Manchester
English legal scholars
Academic staff of Erasmus University Rotterdam
Fellows of the British Academy
Year of birth missing (living people)